Patsy Ferran is a Spanish-British actress.

Early life
Ferran was born in Valencia, Spain, in 1989. Her father is from Barcelona and her mother is from Valencia. The family moved to England when Ferran was a child. She attended Notre Dame School, an all-girls convent school in Cobham, Surrey.

She read Drama and Theatre Arts at Birmingham University, and trained at the Royal Academy of Dramatic Art, graduating in 2014.

Theatre

Filmography

Film

Television

Awards and nominations

References

External links

Living people
1989 births
21st-century Spanish actresses
Alumni of RADA
Alumni of the University of Birmingham
Laurence Olivier Award winners
People educated at Notre Dame School, Surrey
People from Valencia
Spanish emigrants to the United Kingdom
21st-century British actresses